Municipal Waste is an American crossover thrash band from Richmond, Virginia, formed in 2001. To date, the band has released seven studio albums, three EPs and four splits. They have gone through a few line-up changes, leaving vocalist Tony Foresta and rhythm guitarist Ryan Waste as the only constant members. In addition to Foresta and Waste, their current lineup includes Philip "Land Phil" Hall on bass, Dave Witte on drums and Nick "Nikropolis" Poulos on lead guitar.

History
Municipal Waste was formed in Richmond, Virginia in 2000. Municipal Waste played their first show at a Richmond New Year's Eve Keg party in 2000–2001. The band was blamed for inciting a small riot. The band took musical influences from crossover thrash bands such as D.R.I., Suicidal Tendencies, Animosity-era Corrosion of Conformity, Nuclear Assault and Attitude Adjustment. Municipal Waste toured throughout 2001 and 2002 in the US and Mexico. The band released two split albums—one 7" with Bad Acid Trip, the other being a 12" with Crucial Unit. They also had tracks on a number of compilations. In 2002 Brendan Trache left, being replaced by Brandon Ferrell, shortly before the Tango and Thrash on Amendment Records and Waste 'Em All was released on Six Weeks Records. Following the release of Waste 'Em All, both Andy Harris and Brandon Ferrell left the band, being replaced by bassist Philip "LandPhil" Hall and drummer Dave Witte respectively.

In 2005, Municipal Waste signed to Earache Records and recorded the Hazardous Mutation album. During 2005 and 2006, Municipal Waste shot a video for "Unleash the Bastards", with a censored and non-censored version.

In June 2007, Municipal Waste toured with Destruction in the United States, before heading into the studio with Hatebreed and Shadows Fall producer Zeuss, to record their next album The Art of Partying. The band followed this up with a headline tour of Europe, a tour with The Haunted and spots at Wacken Open Air in Germany and Reading and Leeds Festivals. They also went on the road with Suicidal Tendencies. A video was then recorded for the track "Headbanger Face Rip", which was filmed by Troma Entertainment.

In 2007, the band received great acclaim from the music press, with a top five album of the year placing in Sweden's Close Up magazine and top twenty positions in Big Cheese and Kerrang! They also were on the front cover of Metal Maniacs magazine but also made several appearances in NME.

They performed at the UK's Download Festival on June 15, 2008. They also joined At the Gates on their "Suicidal Final Tour" along with Darkest Hour, Toxic Holocaust and Repulsion.

In 2010, the band was confirmed as being part of the soundtrack for Namco Bandai Games' 2010 remake of Splatterhouse.

Municipal Waste released their third album Massive Aggressive in 2009, followed three years later by The Fatal Feast (2012), and then five years later by Slime and Punishment (2017). The band released the EP The Last Rager on October 11, 2019, and their seventh studio album Electrified Brain was released on July 1, 2022.

Musical style and influences
The band members themselves have stated that they are influenced from groups such as Suicidal Tendencies, D.R.I., Slayer, Anthrax, Exodus, Testament, Sepultura, Nuclear Assault, S.O.D., M.O.D. and the Cro-Mags.

The band's songwriting approach takes form in short, crossover thrash songs. Lyrical topics have to do with alcoholism, mutants, or thrash metal. The music is also described as being, and the band has received the tag "Party thrash" from the media. The band's song titles are also comedic, or give nods to their influences such as "Thrashing's My Business and Business is Good", "The Thrashin' of the Christ", "Thrash? Don't Mind If I Do" and "Drunk as Shit".

Members

Current members
Tony Foresta – lead vocals 
Ryan Waste – rhythm guitar, backing vocals 
Philip "Land Phil" Hall – bass, backing vocals 
Dave Witte – drums 
Nick "Nikropolis" Poulos – lead guitar 

Former members
Andy Harris – bass 
Brendan Trache – drums 
Brandon Ferrell – drums 

Timeline

Discography

Studio albums
 Waste 'Em All (2003, Six Weeks Records)
 Hazardous Mutation (2005, Earache Records)
 The Art of Partying (2007, Earache Records)
 Massive Aggressive (2009, Earache Records)
 The Fatal Feast (2012, Nuclear Blast Records)
 Slime and Punishment (2017, Nuclear Blast Records)
 Electrified Brain (2022, Nuclear Blast Records)

EPs
 Municipal Waste (2001, Amendment Records / Busted Heads Records)
 Scion Presents: Municipal Waste (2012, Scion Audio Visual)
 Garbage Pack (2012, Night of the Vinyl Dead Records)
 The Last Rager (2019, Nuclear Blast Records)

Splits
 Municipal Waste / Crucial Unit (2002, Six Weeks Records)
 Tango and Thrash (with Bad Acid Trip) (2004, Mordar Records)
 Louder Than Hell (2005, Six Weeks Records)
 Toxic Waste (with Toxic Holocaust) (2012, Tankcrimes Records)

Compilations
 Waste 'Em All / Tango and Thrash (2004, Rabid Dog Records)

Music videos
 "Thrashin's My Business... and Business Is Good"
 "Headbanger Face Rip"
 "Sadistic Magician"
 "Wrong Answer"
 "Acid Sentence"
 "Wolves of Chernobyl"
 "The Fatal Feast"
 "Repossession"
 "You're Cut Off"
 "Breathe Grease"
 "Slime And Punishment"
 "Electrified Brain"
 "Grave Dive"
 "Crank The Heat"
 "High Speed Steel"

Contributed tracks to

Awards and accolades
Loudwire Music Awards

|-
| 2017 || Amateur Sketch || Metal Song of the Year ||

References

External links
 Official website
 Interview with Dave Witte

2001 establishments in Virginia
American thrash metal musical groups
Crossover thrash groups
Earache Records artists
Heavy metal musical groups from Virginia
Musical groups established in 2001
Music of Richmond, Virginia
Musical quintets
Nuclear Blast artists
Political music groups
Hardcore punk groups from Virginia